Deh Nazri (also Romanized as Deh Naz̄rī and Deh-e Naz̄rī; also known as Deh-e Nadrī and Naz̄rī) is a village in Qaleh Asgar Rural District, Lalehzar District, Bardsir County, Kerman Province, Iran. At the 2006 census, its population was 79, in 18 families.

References 

Populated places in Bardsir County